James Shaw is a paralympic athlete from Canada competing mainly in category F38 throwing events.

James has competed in three Paralympics.  In 1996 he won gold in both the F34/37 discus and shot and bronze in the javelin.  For the 2000 Summer Paralympics he concentrated on the discus and won his second gold medal, this time in the F38 class.  2004 saw him compete in the discus and shot put but was unable to medal in either.

References

Paralympic track and field athletes of Canada
Athletes (track and field) at the 1996 Summer Paralympics
Athletes (track and field) at the 2000 Summer Paralympics
Athletes (track and field) at the 2004 Summer Paralympics
Paralympic gold medalists for Canada
Paralympic bronze medalists for Canada
Living people
Medalists at the 1996 Summer Paralympics
Medalists at the 2000 Summer Paralympics
Year of birth missing (living people)
Paralympic medalists in athletics (track and field)
Medalists at the 2007 Parapan American Games
Canadian male shot putters
Canadian male discus throwers
Canadian male javelin throwers
20th-century Canadian people
21st-century Canadian people